The UEFA Women's U-19 Championship 2011 Final Tournament was held in Italy between 30 May and 11 June 2011. Players born after 1 January 1992 were eligible to participate in this competition.

As the final tournament took place in an odd year this tournament serves as the European qualifying tournament for the 2012 FIFA U-20 Women's World Cup.

Germany defeated Norway in the final 8–1 to win their sixth title.

Tournament structure

Qualifications
There were two separate rounds of qualifications held before the Final Tournament.

First qualifying round

In the first qualifying round 44 teams were drawn into 11 groups. The top two of each group and the best third-place finisher, counting only matches against the top two in the group, advanced.

Second qualifying round

In the second round the 23 teams from the first qualifying round were joined by top seeds Germany. The 24 teams of this round were drawn into six groups of four teams. The group winners and the runners-up team with the best record against the sides first and third in their group advance to the final tournament.

Final tournament
The 7 teams advancing from the second qualifying round were joined by host nation Italy. The eight teams were drawn into two groups of four with the top two teams of each group advancing to the semi-finals. The draw was made on 14 April 2011.

Qualified teams

Italy were qualified as hosts. Belgium was best group runner-up in the second qualifying round. The other six teams won their groups.

Group stage
The draw was held on 14 April 2011 at Cervia, Italy.

Group A

Group B

Knockout stage

Semifinals

Final

Awards

Goal scorers
7 goals
 Melissa Bjånesøy

5 goals
 Lena Lotzen

3 goals

 Isabella Schmid
 Katia Coppola

2 goals

 Maria-Laura Aga
 Eunice Beckmann
 Anja Hegenauer
 Ramona Petzelberger
 Ivana Rudelic
 Lisa Alborghetti
 Kristine Hegland
 Anna Cholovyaga

1 goal

 Justine Vanhaevermaet
 Luisa Wensing
 Roberta Filippozzi
 Elisa Lecce
 Cecilia Salvai
 Pia Rijsdijk
 Shanice van de Sanden
 Ada Hegerberg
 Andrine Hegerberg
 Caroline Hansen
 Guro Reiten
 Tatiana Ananyeva
 Nadezhda Koltakova
 Naiara Beristain
 Eseosa Aigbogun
 Cora Canetta
 Nadine Fässler
 Michelle Probst
 Corina Saner

own goal
  Maren Knudsen (playing against Spain)

References

External links
Official website at UEFA.com

 
2011
women
2011
UEFA
2010–11 in Italian women's football
2010–11 in German women's football
2011 in Norwegian women's football
2010–11 in Swiss football
2010–11 in Russian football
2010–11 in Belgian football
2010–11 in Dutch women's football
2010–11 in Spanish women's football
May 2011 sports events in Europe
June 2011 sports events in Europe
2011 in youth association football